The soundtrack for the film Twin Peaks: Fire Walk with Me was composed by Angelo Badalamenti and released on August 7, 1992, by Warner Bros. Records.

Track listing

Personnel 
Credits adapted from the liner notes of Twin Peaks: Fire Walk With Me.

Performance 

 Andy Armer – keyboard 
 Angelo Badalamenti – keyboard ; vocals, piano, synthesizer 
 Donald Bailey – drums 
 Vinnie Bell – electric guitar ; bass guitar ; acoustic guitar 
 Myles Boisen – guitar 
 Ron Carter – acoustic bass 
 David Cooper – vibraphone 
 Julee Cruise – vocals 
 Alvin Blythe Jr. – saxophone 
 William Fairbanks – bass guitar 
 Don Falzone – bass guitar 
 Steven Hodges – drums 
 Jay Hoggard – vibraphone 
 Jim Hynes – trumpet 
 David Jaurequi – guitar 
 Brian Kirk – drums 
 Kinny Landrum – keyboard 
 David Lynch – percussion 
 Bill Mays – piano ; keyboards 
 Rufus Reid – acoustic bass 
 Albert Regni – tenor saxophone 
 Bob Rose – electric guitar, acoustic guitar 
 Jimmy Scott – vocals 
 David Slusser – keyboard 
 Ken-Ichi Shimazu – piano 
 Grady Tate – drums 
 Buster Williams – acoustic bass

Technical 

 Angelo Badalamenti – production ; arrangement, orchestration 
 David Bianco – recording 
 Ted Jensen – mastering 
 David Lynch – production ; arrangement, orchestration 
 Art Pohlemus – recording  
 Tom Reaction – art direction, design
 Michael Semanick – recording 
 David Slusser – arrangement, orchestration

References 

1992 soundtrack albums
Albums produced by Angelo Badalamenti
Albums produced by David Lynch
Music of Twin Peaks
Angelo Badalamenti soundtracks
Horror film soundtracks
Warner Records soundtracks
1990s film soundtrack albums